Daniela Agreste Braga (born 23 January 1992), also known as Dany Braga, is a Brazilian model.

Career
Daniela has been featured on the cover of Harper's Bazaar, V, Elle, French Revue des Modes, and in editorials for Vogue (UK), CR Fashion Book, Harper's Bazaar, Interview, Marie Claire, Numéro, Purple, U and Vision China.

She was featured in the Victoria's Secret Fashion Show in 2014, 2015, 2016 and 2017.

She has walked in fashion shows for Balmain,  Givenchy,  Blumarine, Ermanno Scervino, Etam, Alexandre Vauthier, Anthony Vaccarello, Leonard, Loewe, Maiyet, Max Mara, Moncler, Paco Rabanne, Shiatzy Chen, Valentin Yudashkin, Victoria's Secret and Vionnet among others.

She has starred in advertisements for mega brands including Givenchy,  Saks Fifth Avenue, Bebe, Blanco, Dafiti, Nordstrom, Plein Sud, Pull & Bear, Riachuelo and Target.

Personal life 
Since the end of 2018, she has been in a relationship with Adam Freede, an American businessman. On 26 September 2020, they became engaged. In December 2021, Daniela and Adam were married at Amanera in the Dominican Republic during a week-long wedding celebration with 75 guests., on March 31, 2022, announces that they expecting their first child, in the Instagram account of the brazilian model.

References

External links

Official website

1992 births
Living people
People from São Paulo
Brazilian female models
Next Management models
Elite Model Management models
21st-century Brazilian women